The Asia Group is a strategic advisory firm based in Washington DC. The firm was founded in 2013 by Dr. Kurt Campbell, the former Assistant Secretary of State for East Asian and Pacific Affairs and Nirav Patel, former Deputy Assistant Secretary of State for Strategy and Multilateral Affairs.

On June 21, 2017, The Asia Group announced that former US Ambassador to India Richard Verma would be joining the firm as its Vice Chairman. In 2019, the former U.S. consul general in Hong Kong, Kurt Tong joined the firm as partner.

References

Financial services companies established in 2013
Financial services companies of the United States
Privately held companies based in Washington, D.C.
Consulting firms established in 2013
2013 establishments in the United States
2013 establishments in Washington, D.C.
Companies established in 2013